Jordan participated at the 2018 Summer Youth Olympics in Buenos Aires, Argentina from 6 October to 18 October 2018.

Athletics

Basketball

Jordan qualified a boys' team based on the U18 3x3 National Federation Ranking.

 Boys' tournament - 1 team of 4 athletes

Equestrian

Jordan qualified a rider based on its ranking in the FEI World Jumping Challenge Rankings.

 Individual Jumping - 1 athlete

Summary

Karate

Jordan qualified one athlete based on its performance at one of the Karate Qualification Tournaments.

 Boys' -61 kg - Abdallah Hammad

Swimming

Boys

Taekwondo

Boys

Girls

References

2018 in Jordanian sport
Nations at the 2018 Summer Youth Olympics
Jordan at the Youth Olympics